333 is the fourth studio album by Swedish rapper Bladee. It was released on July 16, 2020, by YEAR0001, making it Bladee's second release of 2020, following April's Exeter. 333 is notable among Bladee's discography in featuring no collaborations from fellow Drain Gang members Thaiboy Digital and Ecco2K. The album has been associated with the hyperpop microgenre that rose to popularity in 2020, with one writer describing it as "hyperpop-adjacent".

Track listing

References 

2020 albums
Bladee albums